Too Far Gone may refer to:

 "Too Far Gone" (The Walking Dead), an episode of the television series The Walking Dead
 Too Far Gone (Cane Hill album), 2018
 Too Far Gone (Catherine Britt album), 2006
 "Too Far Gone" (song), a 2003 song by Lisa Scott-Lee
 "Too Far Gone", a song by Bradley Cooper from A Star Is Born soundtrack, 2018
 "Too Far Gone", a song by Neil Young from Freedom, 1989
 "Too Far Gone", a song by Status Quo from Rockin' All Over the World, 1977
 "Too Far Gone", a song by The All-American Rejects from The All-American Rejects, 2002